Noble High School may refer to one of the following high schools in the United States:

Noble High School (Oklahoma), Noble, Oklahoma
Noble Public Schools is a 5A District located in Noble, Oklahoma. The district has 3 Elementary Schools, 1 Middle School and 1 High School and has 1,760 total employees across all of its locations.
Noble High School (Maine), North Berwick, Maine
Central Noble High School, Albion, Indiana
East Noble High School, Kendallville, Indiana
West Noble High School, Ligonier, Indiana
Noble Street Charter High School, Chicago, Illinois